Caribbean English (CE, CarE) is a set of dialects of the English language which are spoken in the Caribbean and most countries on the Caribbean coasts of Central America and South America. Caribbean English is influenced by but is distinct to the English-based creole languages spoken in the region. Though dialects of Caribbean English vary structurally and phonetically across the region, all are primarily derived from British English and West African languages. In countries with a plurality Indian population, such as Trinidad and Tobago and Guyana, Caribbean English has further been influenced by Hindustani and other South Asian languages.

Overview 

 The daily-used English in the Caribbean has a different set of pronouns, typically me, meh or mi, you, yuh, he, she, it, we, wi or alawe, wunna or unu, and dem or day. I, mi, my, he, she, ih, it, we, wi or alawe, allayu or unu, and dem, den, deh for "them" with Central Americans.
 Consonant changes occur like h-dropping or th-stopping are common. 
 Some might be "sing-songish" in Trinidad and the Bahamas.
 Rhotic: Bajan (Barbadian), Guyanese
 Influenced by Irish English: Jamaican, Bajan
 Influenced by any of the above, as well as Spanish and indigenous languages: Central American English dialects like the Belizean Creole (Kriol), or the Mískito Coastal Creole and Rama Cay Creole spoken in Nicaragua

However, the English that is used in the media, education, and business and in formal or semi-formal discourse approaches the internationally understood variety of Standard English (British English in all former and present British territories and American English in Puerto Rico and the US Virgin Islands) but with an Afro-Caribbean cadence (Spanish cadence in Puerto Rico and the Archipelago of San Andrés, Providencia and Santa Catalina).

Dialects 

The first-order dialects deemed constituent of Caribbean English vary within scholarly literature. For instance, the Oxford English Dictionary includes only 'the forms of English as spoken in Jamaica, Trinidad & Tobago, Guyana, Belize, the Bahamas and Barbados, as well as in some of the smaller Eastern Caribbean nations' in deriving its phonetic transcriptions. The Dictionary of Caribbean English Usage further includes the dialects of Bermuda, the Cayman Islands, the Virgin Islands, the Netherlands Antilles, Suriname, and the Turks and Caicos.

Caribbean English-based creole languages are commonly (in popular literature) or sometimes (in scholarly literature) considered dialects of Caribbean English.

History 
The development of Caribbean English is dated to the West Indian exploits of Elizabethan sea dogs, which are credited with introducing to England names for new-found flora and fauna via, for instance, Hakluyt's Principall Navigations of 1589 and Raleigh's Discoverie of the Empyre of Guiana of 1596. As English settlements followed shortly thereafter, Caribbean English has been deemed 'the oldest exportation of that language from its British homeland.' 

Two sorts of anglophone immigrants to the seventeenth-century West Indies have been described in literature – the first, comprised of indentured servants and settlers mainly from southwestern England, predominantly speaking non-standard vernaculars of English; the second, comprised of colonial administrators, missionaries, and educators, predominantly speaking more standard forms of the language. The former, along with African slaves, are credited with the development and spread of [non-standard-] English-derived creole languages, while the latter are noted as frequent sources of derision of such speech.

Features 

Caribbean English accents and pronunciation are variable within and across sub-dialects. For instance, Barbadian English is fully rhotic, while Jamaican English is not. Further, within Jamaican English, h-dropping is common in some social classes, but uncommon in others. Additionally, in territories with English-derived creole languages, the phonetic distinction between English and creole is thought to be continuous rather than discrete, with the creole acrolect differing 'only trivially' from English.

Nevertheless, there is thought to be 'a general sense in which a "West Indian accent" is distinguishable as such anywhere in the world.' Likely reasons for this have been described as 'the general quality of CE [Caribbean English] vowels, the sharp reduction in the number of diphthongal glides and, the most distinguishing feature of all, the phrasal intonation [and] separation of syllabic pitch and stress in CE.' Broadly, the middle-register of Caribbean English is thought to contain eight fewer phonemes than Received Pronunciation.

The lexicon of Caribbean English varies, to an extent, across and within sub-dialects. '[T]he bulk of the vocabulary,' however, has been described as 'identical' across the region. Additionally, in territories with English-derived creole languages, the lexical distinction between English and creole is thought to be continuous rather than discrete, such that 'structurally it is impossible to draw exact lines between them.'

Tables

Standardisation 
The standardisation of Caribbean English is thought to have begun upon the advent of government-funded public education in the West Indies in 1833. Notably, the earliest public teachers, credited with first developing Standard Caribbean English, had been 'imported direct from Britain, or recruited from among the "coloured" class on the islands who had benefited from their mixed parentage by receiving the rudiments of education.' Linguistically, however, the growth of public education in said standard register resulted in 'a practical bilingualism' that has been described as a typical example of diglossia. By the late twentieth century, as most territories transitioned to sovereignty and adopted English as their official language, 'efforts were made to define norms for Caribbean English usage in public, formal domains, and more specifically examination settings.' These are thought to have culminated in the 1996 publication of the Dictionary of Caribbean English Usage, commonly deemed the authority on Standard Caribbean English, with the former defining the latter as 'the total body of regional lexicon and usage bound to a common core of syntax and morphology shared with [non-Caribbean forms of standardised English], but aurally distinguished as a discrete type by certain phonological features.'

Study 
The earliest scholarly dictionary of Caribbean English is thought to have been the 1967 Dictionary of Jamaican English. During Easter of that same year, the Caribbean Association of Headmasters and Headmistresses resolved – 
Said resolution was promptly forwarded to Richard Allsopp, who by mid-1967 'already had some ten shoe-boxes each of about 1,000 6 × 4 cards and many loose unfiled cuttings, notes and other material [from Guyana, the Lesser Antilles, Belize, Jamaica, and Trinidad].' In 1971, Allsopp introduced the Caribbean Lexicography Project as 'a survey of [English] usage in the intermediate and upper ranges of the West Indian speech continuum.' This set the stage for the seminal Dictionary of Caribbean English Usage, first published 1996.

Samples 

Standard English: Where is that boy? 

Barbados: 'Wherr dah boi?' (spoken very quickly, rhotic with glottal stops)
San Andrés and Providencia: 'Weh dah boi deh?'
Jamaica: 'Weh dah bwoy deh?' (sporadic rhoticity from Irish and Scottish influence); or 'Wey iz dat boi?'  (non-rhotic and similar to the accents of southwestern England and Wales)
Belize: 'Weh iz dat bwoy deh?' (British and North American influence but deeper in tone)
Trinidad: 'Wey dat boy deh?'
Bahamas: 'Wey dat boy iz?' [Some would more likely say bey, instead of boy]
Guyana and Tobago: 'Weyr iz daht boy/bai?' (urban) or 'Wey dat boy dey?' (rural) (many variations depending on urban/rural location, Afro or Indo descent or area, and competency in standard English; sporadic rhoticity)
 Saint Vincent and the Grenadines: 'Wey dah boy deh deh?' (non-rhotic)
Belize, Bluefields, Pearl Lagoon, Corn Islands, Bay Islands Department, Limón, Bocas del Toro Province, Puerto Rico, Cayman Islands and the Virgin Islands: 'Wehr iz daht booy?' (distinct, sporadic rhoticity, pronunciation becomes quite different from Creole pronunciation)
 Dominica: 'Weh dat boy nuh?'/'Weh dat boy be nuh?' (spoken harshly and with a deep tone)

The written form of the English language in the former and current British-controlled Caribbean countries conforms to the spelling and the grammar styles of Britain and in Puerto Rico and US Virgin Islands conforms to the spelling and the grammar styles of United States.

See also

Anguillan Creole
Antiguan and Barbudan Creole
Bajan Creole
Bajan English
Bahamian Creole
Bahamian English
Bay Islands English
Belizean Creole
Belizean English
Bermudian English
Bocas del Toro Creole
Cayman Islands English
English-based creole languages
Grenadian Creole English
Guyanese Creole
Jamaican English
Jamaican Patois
Limonese Creole
Miskito Coast Creole
Montserrat Creole
Puerto Rican English
Rama Cay Creole
Regional accents of English speakers
Saban English
Saint Kitts Creole
Samaná English
San Andrés–Providencia Creole
Tobagonian Creole 
Turks and Caicos Creole
Trinidadian Creole
Trinidadian and Tobagonian English
Vincentian Creole
Virgin Islands Creole

Notes and references

Explanatory footnotes

Short citations

Full citations

External links
Linguistic map of Caribbean English dialects from Muturzikin.com
Cross-Referencing West Indian Dictionary